Hexazine (also known as hexaazabenzene) is an allotrope of nitrogen composed of 6 nitrogen atoms arranged in a ring-like structure analogous to that of benzene. As a neutral-charged species, it would be the final member of the azabenzene (azine) series, in which all of the methine groups of the benzene molecule have been replaced with nitrogen atoms. The two last members of this series, hexazine and pentazine, have not been observed, although all other members of the azine series have (such as pyridine, pyrimidine, pyridazine, pyrazine, triazines, and tetrazines).

While a neutral-charged hexazine species was not synthesized, two negativally-charged variants, [N6]2- and [N6]4-, have been produced in potassium-nitrogen compounds under very high pressures (> 40 GPa) and temperatures (> 2000 K). In particular, [N6]4- is aromatic, respecting Hückel's rule, while is [N6]2- anti-aromatic.

Stability
The hexazine molecule bears a structural similarity to the very stable benzene molecule. Like benzene, it has been calculated that hexazine is likely an aromatic molecule. Despite this, it has yet to be synthesized. Additionally, it has been predicted computationally that the hexazine molecule is highly unstable, possibly due to the lone pairs on the nitrogen atoms, which may repel each other electrostatically and/or cause electron-donation to sigma antibonding orbitals.

See also
 6-membered rings with other numbers of nitrogen atoms: pyridines, diazines, triazines, tetrazines, and (like hexazine, theoretical) pentazines
 Azide
 Pentazole (HN5)
 Other molecular allotropes of nitrogen: tetranitrogen (N4), octaazacubane (N8)
 Other inorganic benzene analogues: borazine, hexaphosphabenzene

References

Further reading

External links

Azines (heterocycles)
Aromatic compounds
Hypothetical chemical compounds
Allotropes of nitrogen
Six-membered rings